Tania Bailey (born 2 October 1979, in Stamford,) is a professional squash player from England.

Career
As a junior player, Bailey won the World Junior Championship in 1997 and captained the England team to World and European junior team titles. A car accident led to career-threatening knee surgery at the age of 21, but she successfully recovered and resumed her playing career.

Her greatest achievement was being part of the England team that won the 2000 Women's World Team Squash Championships held in Sheffield.

In 2003, Bailey finished runner-up to Sarah Fitz-Gerald at the British Open. She reached a career-high ranking of World No. 4 that year.  In February 2006, Bailey clinched her first British National Championships in Manchester, defeating the No.1 seed and previous champion Linda Elriani 3–1 in a hotly contested 76 minute final.

She won a silver medal in the women's doubles at the 2002 Commonwealth Games and a bronze medal in the women's doubles event at the 2006 Commonwealth Games.

In 2010, she was part of the English team that won the silver medal at the 2010 Women's World Team Squash Championships.

Major World Series final appearances

British Open: 1 finals (0 title, 1 runner-up)

Hong Kong Open: 1 final (0 title, 1 runner-up)

Malaysian Open: 2 finals (0 title, 2 runner-up)

See also
 Official Women's Squash World Ranking

References

External links 
 
 
 
 Article at Squashtalk.com
 Tania's local club - Stamford Squash Club

1979 births
Living people
English female squash players
Commonwealth Games silver medallists for England
Commonwealth Games bronze medallists for England
Commonwealth Games medallists in squash
Squash players at the 2002 Commonwealth Games
Squash players at the 2006 Commonwealth Games
People from Stamford, Lincolnshire
Medallists at the 2002 Commonwealth Games
Medallists at the 2006 Commonwealth Games